| tries = {{#expr: 
 +5 +6 +5 +6 +4 +7 +6 +7 
 +0 +8 +3 +5 +5 +2 +3 +6 
 +2 +2 +3 +1 +6 +6 +9 +2
 +6 +6 +4 +1 +1 +8 +3 +6
+6 +2 + 5
}}
| top point scorer = (78 points)
| top try scorer = (3 tries)
| venue = Sixways Stadium, Worcester
| attendance2 = 8,100
| champions = Harlequins
| count = 3
| runner-up = Sale Sharks
| website = www.lv.com
| previous year = 2011–12
| previous tournament = 2011–12 LV Cup
| next year = 2013–14
| next tournament = 2013–14 LV Cup
}}

The 2012–13 LV Cup (styled as the LV= Cup) is the 42nd season of England's national rugby union cup competition, and the eighth to follow the Anglo-Welsh format.

The competition consists of the four Welsh Pro12 teams and the 12 English Premiership clubs arranged into pools consisting of three English and one Welsh team. English clubs have been allocated to the pools depending on their finish in the 2011-12 Aviva Premiership. Welsh regions have been allocated to the pools to avoid repeating fixtures from the Heineken and Amlin Challenge cups where possible. Teams are guaranteed two home and two away pool matches, with teams in Pools 1 and 4 playing each other and teams in Pools 2 and 3 playing each other, with the top team from each pool qualifying for the semi finals. The competition will take place during the Autumn Internationals window and during the Six Nations thus allowing teams to develop their squad players.

Leicester Tigers are defending champions this season after claiming the cup with a 26–14 victory over Northampton Saints in the final at Sixways Stadium in Worcester. It was the seventh victory for Leicester Tigers (a record) in the competition, and the second since the current Anglo-Welsh format was adopted in 2005.

Pool stages

Points system 
The points scoring system for the pool stages will be as follows:
4 points for a win
2 points for a draw
1 bonus point for scoring four or more tries in a match (TB)
1 bonus point for a loss by seven points or less (LB)

Pool 1 v Pool 4

Round 1

Round 2

Round 3

Round 4

Pool 2 v Pool 3

Round 1

Round 2

Round 3

Round 4

Knock–out stage

Qualification criteria 
The top teams from each pool qualify for the knockout stages. The pool winners will be decided by the following criteria:
1. The pool winner will be the club with the highest number of match points in each pool. The pool winners will be ranked 1 to 4 by reference to the number of match points earned in the pools. 
2. If two or more clubs in the same pool end the pool stage equal on match points, then the order in which they have finished will be determined by: 
i. the greater number of matches won by the club and 
ii. if the number of matches won is equal, the club with the greater total number of tries scored and 
iii. if the total number of tries scored is equal, the club with the greater points difference (points scored for, less points scored against) and 
iv. if the points difference is equal, the club with the fewer number of red cards and 
v. if the number of red cards is the same, by the toss a coin.

Each of the four qualifying clubs shall be ranked as above and shall play each other as follows: 
Semi-final 1 – 1st ranked club v 4th ranked club 
Semi-final 2 – 2nd ranked club v 3rd ranked club 
The first club listed in each of the semi-final matches shall be the home club.

Semi-finals

Final 

 Harlequins gain a place in the 2013–14 Heineken Cup by winning this competition.

Top scorers

Top points scorers

Top try scorers

See also 
2012–13 English Premiership (rugby union)
2012–13 Pro 12

External links 
 
 Anglo Welsh Cup on Premiership Rugby website
 Tables
 Fixtures and results
 Anglo Welsh Cup website

References

2012–13 in Welsh rugby union
2012–13 English Premiership (rugby union)
2012-13
2012–13 rugby union tournaments for clubs